Biscay is a province of Spain and a historical territory of the Basque Country, heir of the ancient Lordship of Biscay, lying on the south shore of the eponymous bay. The capital and largest city is Bilbao. 

Biscay is one of the most renowned and prosperous provinces of Spain, historically a major trading hub in the Atlantic Ocean since medieval times and, later on, one of the largest industrial and financial centers of the Iberian peninsula. Since the extensive deindustrialization that took place throughout the 1970s, the economy has come to rely more on the services sector.

Etymology
It is accepted in linguistics (Koldo Mitxelena, etc.) that Bizkaia is a cognate of bizkar (cf. Biscarrosse in Aquitaine), with both place-name variants well attested in the whole Basque Country and out meaning 'low ridge' or 'prominence' (Iheldo bizchaya attested in 1141 for the Monte Igueldo in San Sebastián).

Denominations

Bizkaia 
Bizkaia is the official name, and it is used on official documents. It is also the most used denomination by the media in Spanish in the Basque Country. It is also the denomination used in the Basque version of the Spanish constitution and in the Basque version of the Statute of Autonomy of the Basque Country.

Bizkaia is the only official denomination in Spanish or Basque approved for the historical territory by the General Council of the province and the Spanish laws.

Vizcaya 
Vizcaya is the denomination in Spanish, recommended by the Royal Spanish Academy. It is used in non-official documents. It is also the Spanish denomination used in the Spanish version of the Constitution and in the Spanish version of the Statute of Autonomy of the Basque Country.

History 
Biscay has been inhabited since the Middle Paleolithic, as attested by the archaeological remains and cave paintings found in its many caves. The Roman presence had little impact in the region, and the Basque language and traditions have survived to this day.

Biscay was identified in records of the Middle Ages, as a dependency of the Kingdom of Pamplona (11th century) that became autonomous and finally a part of the Crown of Castile. The first mention of the name Biscay was recorded in a donation act to the monastery of Bickaga, located on the ria of Mundaka. According to Anton Erkoreka, the Vikings had a commercial base there from which they were expelled by 825. The ria of Mundaka is the easiest route to the river Ebro and at the end of it, the Mediterranean Sea and trade.

In the modern age, the province became a major commercial and industrial area. Its prime harbour of Bilbao soon became the main Castilian gateway to Europe. Later, in the 19th and 20th centuries, the abundance of prime quality iron ore and the lack of feudal castes favored rapid industrialization.

Paleolithic

Middle Paleolithic
The first evidence of human dwellings (Neanderthal people) in Biscay happens in this period of prehistory. Mousterian artifacts have been found in three sites in Biscay: Benta Laperra (Karrantza), Kurtzia (Getxo) and Murua (Durangoaldea).

Late Paleolithic

Chatelperronian culture (normally associated with Neanderthals as well) can be found in Santimamiñe cave (Kortezubi).

The most important settlements by modern humans (H. sapiens) can be considered the following:
Aurignacian culture: Benta Laperra, Kurztia, and Lumentxa (Lekeitio)
Gravettian culture: Santimamiñe, Bolinkoba (Durangoaldea) and Atxurra (Markina)
Solutrean culture: Santimamiñe and Bolinkoba
Magdalenian culture: Santimamiñe and Lumentxa

Paleolithic art is also present. The Benta Laperra cave has the oldest paintings, maybe from the Aurignacian or Solutrean period. Bison and bear are the animals depicted, together with abstract signs. The murals of Arenaza (Galdames) and Santimamiñe were created in later periods (Magdalenian). In Arenaza female deer are the dominant motif; Santimamiñe features bison, horses, goats and deer.

Epi-paleolithic
This period (also called Mesolithic sometimes) is dominated in Biscay by the Azilian culture. Tools become smaller and more refined and, while hunting remains, fishing and seafood gathering become more important; there is evidence of consumption of wild fruits as well. Santimamiñe is one of the most important sites of this period. Others are Arenaza, Atxeta (not far from Santimamiñe), Lumentxa and nearby Urtiaga and Santa Catalina, together with Bolinkoba and neighbour Silibranka.

Neolithic
While the first evidences of Neolithic contact in the Basque Country can be dated to the 4th millennium BCE, it was not until the beginning of the 3rd that the area accepted, gradually and without radical changes, the advances of agricultural cultivation and domestication of sheep. Biscay was not particularly affected by this change and only three sites can be mentioned for this period: Arenaza, Santimamiñe and Kobeaga (Ea) and the advances adopted seem limited initially to sheep, domestic goats and very scarce pottery.

Together with Neolithic technologies, Megalithism also arrives. It will be the most common form of burial (simple dolmen) until c. 1500 BCE.

Chalcolithic and Bronze Age
While open-air settlement started to become common as the population grew, they still used caves and natural shelters in Biscay in the Chalcolithic and Bronze Age. Hunting game became a less important source of protein, as the people relied on sheep, goats and some bovine cattle. Metallic tools become more common but stone-made ones are also used.

Pottery types shows great continuity (not decorated) until the bell beaker makes its appearance.

The sites of this period now cover all the territory of Biscay, many being open air settlements, but the most important caves of the Paleolithic are still in use as well.

Iron Age 
Few sites have been identified for this period. Caves are abandoned for the most part but they still reveal some remains. The main caves of prehistory (Arenaza, Santimamiñe, Lumentxa) were still inhabited.

Roman period

Roman geographers identified two tribes in the territory now known as Biscay: the Caristii and Autrigones. The Caristii dwelt in nuclear Biscay, east of the firth of Bilbao, extending also into Northern Araba and some areas of Gipuzkoa, up to the river Deba. The Autrigones dwelt in the westernmost part of Biscay and Araba, extending also into the provinces of Cantabria, Burgos and La Rioja. Based in toponymy, historical and archaeological evidence, it is thought that these tribes spoke the Basque language. The borders of the Biscayan dialect of Basque seem to be those of the Caristian territory, with an exception of the areas that have lost the old language.

There is no indication to resistance to Roman occupation in all the Basque area (excepting Aquitaine) until the late feudalizing period. Roman sources mention several towns in the area, Flaviobriga and Portus Amanus, though they have not been located. The site of Forua, near Gernika, has yielded archaeological evidence of Roman presence  .

In the late Roman period, together with the rest of the Basque Country, Biscay seems to have revolted against Roman domination and the growing society organized by feudalism.

Middle Ages 
In the Early Middle Ages, the history of Biscay cannot be separated from that of the Basque Country as a whole. The area was de facto independent although Visigoths and Franks attempted to assert their domination from time to time. Encounters between the Visigoths and Basques usually led to defeat for the latter. The Visigoths established an outlying post at the later city of Vitoria to counter incursions and the migration of Basques from the coastal regions to the north.

In 905, Leonese chronicles define for the first time the Kingdom of Pamplona as including all the western Basque provinces, as well as the Rioja region.  The territories that would later constitute Biscay were included in that state.

In the conflicts that the newly sovereign Kingdom of Castile and Pamplona/Navarre had in the 11th and 12th century, the Castilians were supported by many landowners from La Rioja, who sought to consolidate their holdings under Castilian feudal law.  These pro-Castilian lords were led by the house of Haro, who were eventually granted the rule of newly created Biscay, initially made up of the valleys of Uribe, Busturia, Markina, Zornotza and Arratia, plus several towns and the city of Urduina.  It is unclear when this happened, but tradition says that Iñigo López was the first Lord of Biscay in 1043.

The title to the lordship was inherited by Iñigo López's descendants until, by inheritance, in 1370 it passed to John I of Castile. It became one of the titles of the king of Castile. Since then it remained connected to the crown, first to that of Castile and then, from Charles I, to that of Spain, as ruler of the Crown of Castile. It was conditioned on the lord swearing to defend and maintain the fuero (Biscayan laws, derived from Navarrese and Basque customary rights), which affirmed that the possessors of the sovereignty of the lordship were the Biscayans and that, at least in theory, they could refute the lord.

The lords and later the kings, came to swear the Statutes to the oak of Gernika, where the assembly of the Lordship sits.

Modern age

In the modern ages commerce on took great importance, specially for the Port of Bilbao, to which the kings granted privileges in 1511 for trade with the ports of the Spanish Empire. Bilbao was already the main Castilian harbour, from where wool was shipped to Flanders, and other goods were imported.

In 1628, the separate territory of Durango was incorporated to Biscay. In the same century the so-called chartered municipalities west of Biscay were also incorporated in different dates, becoming another subdivision of Biscay: Encartaciones (Enkarterriak).

The coastal towns had a sizable fleet of their own, mostly dedicated to fishing and trade. Along with other Basque towns of Gipuzkoa and Labourd, they were largely responsible for the partial extinction of North Atlantic right whales in the Bay of Biscay and of the first unstable settlement by Europeans in Newfoundland. They signed separate treaties with other powers, particularly England.

After the Napoleonic wars, Biscay, along with the other Basque provinces, were threatened to have their self-rule cut by the now Liberal Spanish Cortes. Together with opposing factions that supported different parties for the throne, this desire to maintain foral rights contributed to the successive Carlist Wars. The Biscayan government and other Basque provinces supported Carlos V, who represented an autocratic monarch who would preserve tradition.

Many of the towns though, notably Bilbao, were aligned with the Liberal government of Madrid. In the end, with victory by anti-Carlists, the wars resulted in successive cuts of the wide autonomy held by Biscay and the other provinces.

In the 1850s extensive prime quality iron resources were discovered in Biscay. This brought much foreign investment mainly from England and France. Development of these resources led to greater industrialization, which made Biscay one of Spain's richest provinces. Together with the industrialisation, important bourgeois families, such as Ybarra, Chávarri and Lezama-Leguizamón, developed from the new sources of wealth. The great industrial (Iberdrola, Altos Hornos de Vizcaya) and financial (Banco Bilbao Vizcaya Argentaria- BBVA) groups were created.

20th century

During the Second Spanish Republic, the Basque Nationalist Party (PNV) governed the province. When the Spanish Civil War broke out in 1936, Biscay supported the Republican side against Francisco Franco's army and ideology. Soon after, the Republic acknowledged a statute of autonomy for the Basque Country. Due to fascist control of large parts of it, the first short-lived Basque Autonomous Community had power only over Biscay and a few nearby villages.

As the fascist army advanced westward from Navarre, defenses were planned and erected around Bilbao, called the Iron Belt. But the engineer in charge, José Goicoechea, defected to the Nationalists, causing the unfinished defenses to be of little value. In 1937, German airplanes under Franco's control destroyed the historic city of Gernika, after having bombed Durango with less severity a few weeks before. Some months later, Bilbao fell to the fascists. The Basque army (Eusko Gudarostea) retreated to Santoña, beyond the limits of Biscay. There they surrendered to the Italian forces (Santoña Agreement), but the Italians yielded to Franco. Other Republican forces considered the surrender a betrayal by the Basques.

Under the dictatorship of Franco, Biscay and Gipuzkoa (exclusively) were declared "traitor provinces" because of their opposition and stripped of any sort of self-rule. Only after Franco's death in 1975 was democracy restored in Spain. The 1978 constitution accepted the particular Basque laws (fueros) and in 1979 the Statute of Guernica was approved whereupon Biscay, Araba and Gipuzkoa formed the Autonomous Community of the Basque Country with its own parliament. During this recent democratic period, Basque Nationalist Party candidates have consistently won elections in Biscay. Recently the foral law was amended to extend it to the towns and the city of Urduina, which had previously always used the general Spanish Civil law.

Geography 

Biscay is bordered by the community of Cantabria and the province of Burgos (in the Castile and León community) to the west, the Basque provinces of Gipuzkoa to the east, and Álava to the south, and by the Cantabrian Sea (Bay of Biscay) to the north. Orduña (Urduña) is a Biscayan exclave located between Alava and Burgos provinces.

Climate

The climate is oceanic, with high precipitation all year round and moderate temperatures, which allow the lush vegetation to grow. Temperatures are more extreme in the higher lands of inner Biscay, where snow is more common during winter.

Features 

The main geographical features of the province are:
The southern high mountain ranges, part of the Basque mountains, that form a continuous barrier with passes not lower than 600 m AMSL, forming the water divide of the Atlantic and Mediterranean basins. These ranges are divided from west to east in Ordunte (Zalama, 1390 m), Salbada (1100 m),  Gorbea (1481 m) and Urkiola (Anboto, 1331 m).
The middle section which is occupied by the main river's valleys: Nervion, Ibaizabal and Kadagua. Kadagua runs west to east from Ordunte, Nervion south to north from Orduña and Ibaizabal east to west from Urkiola. Arratia river runs northwards from Gorbea and joins Ibaizabal. Each valley is separated by medium mountains like Ganekogorta (998m). Other mountains, like Oiz, separate the main valleys from the northern valleys. The northern rivers are: Artibai, Lea, Oka and Butron.
The coast: the main features are the estuary of Bilbao where the main rivers meet the sea and the estuary of Gernika (Urdaibai). The coast is usually high, with cliffs and small inlets and coves.

Administrative divisions

Historical 
Historically, Biscay was divided into merindades (called eskualdeak in Basque), which were two, the Constituent ones and the ones incorporated later.

The constituent ones were (the number indicates their position on the map):

Uribe1
Busturia2
Markina3
Bedia4
Amorebieta (also Zornotza)5
Arratia6

Incorporated later:

Durango
Enkarterri
Orozko
Orduña
Some other independent cities and towns.

Modern 

Currently, Biscay is divided into seven comarcas or regions, each one with its own capital city, subdivisions and municipalities.

These are:

Greater Bilbao, usually divided into subregions:
Bilbao
Left Bank
Uribe-Kosta
Txorierri
Hego Uribe
Mungialdea
Enkarterri
Busturialdea
Durangaldea
Lea-Artibai
Arratia-Nerbioi

Demographics 
According to the 2010 INE census, Biscay has a population of 1,155,772 and its population density of 519.9 inhabitants/km2, only surpassed by the one of Madrid and Barcelona. In 1981 Biscay was the fifth Spanish province in population, and despite the strong demographic crisis the province has been living since the Transition it is today the ninth province in population.

Government and foral institutions 
The government and foral institutions of Biscay, as a historical territory of the Basque Country are the Juntas Generales de Vizcaya and the Foral Diputation of Biscay.

Juntas Generales 

The Juntas Generales of Biscay are a unicameral assembly that has normative authority in the province. Its members, called apoderados, are elected by universal suffrage. The elections are held every four years.

After the 2015 elections, the configuration of the Juntas is the following:

Foral Diputation 
The Foral Diputation has an executive function and regulatory authority in Biscay. The Foral Diputation is configured by a General Deputy, who currently is Unai Rementeria (PNV) and who is chosen by the Juntas Generales and by the rest of deputies.

Transportation

Roads 
Biscay is connected to the rest of provinces by two main highways, the Cantabric Highway, which connects Bilbao and Durango with the French border, with accesses in Eibar, Zarautz and Donostia (the three of them in the province of Gipuzkoa), and the Basque-Aragonese Highway, which connects Bilbao with Zaragoza via Tudela, Calahorra and Logroño.

As well, many secondary roads connect Bilbao with the different towns located in the province.

Air 

Biscay's main and only airport is Bilbao Airport, which is the most important hub in northern Spain, and the number of passengers using the new terminal continues to rise. It is located in the municipalities of Loiu and Sondika.

Commuter rail 

Biscay has different commuter rail services, operated by different companies. Cercanías Bilbao is the commuter rail service "cercanías" offered by Renfe, the national rail company. It connects Bilbao and its neighborhoods with other municipalities and regions inside Biscay, like Barakaldo, Santurtzi, Portugalete, Muskiz, Orduña and others.

EuskoTren has three commuter rail lines in the province; all of them start in Bilbao; one connects the city and Greater Bilbao with the comarca of Durangaldea and finished in Donostia (in the province of Gipuzkoa), other line connecting Greater Bilbao with Busturialdea and other serving the Txorierri region. FEVE also offers a commuter rail service connecting the regions of the Greater Bilbao with Enkarterri.

Long distance railways 
Bilbao-Abando is Biscay's main train station, with regular trains to other Spanish provinces like Burgos, Madrid and Barcelona offered by Renfe. FEVE also offers long distance trains to Cantabria and the Province of León in the Castile and León community.

The Basque Y is the name given to the future high-speed rail that will connect the three cities of the Basque Country; Bilbao (in Biscay), Donostia (in Gipuzkoa) and Vitoria-Gasteiz in Álava.

Metro 

Metro Bilbao is a metro system serving the city of Bilbao and its metropolitan area, the Greater Bilbao region. It connects the city with other municipalities like Basauri, Barakaldo, Santurtzi and Getxo, among others.

Tourism 
Biscay's capital city, Bilbao, is famous for the Guggenheim Museum Bilbao and for its estuary.

Monuments and places of general interest
 Casa de Juntas (House of the Juntas) and the Tree of Gernika, both in Gernika.
 Casa de Juntas (House of the Juntas) of Avellanada, in the Enkarterri region.
 Pozalagua Cave in Karrantza near Balmaseda
 Vizcaya Bridge, linking the towns of Portugalete and Getxo
 Santimamiñe and the Oma forest
 Euskalduna Conference Centre and Concert Hall in Bilbao.
 Gaztelugatxe
 Urdaibai biosphere reserve
 Urkiola Natural Park

See also
 Nueva Vizcaya
 Ondategi

Notes and references

External links

Official website
Señores de Vizcaya: list of all claimed Lords of Biscay and interesting historical maps.

 
Provinces of the Basque Country (autonomous community)